was a village located in Yoshiki District, Gifu Prefecture, Japan.

As of 2003, the village had an estimated population of 3,874 and a population density of 8.15 persons per km2. The total area was 475.12 km2.

On February 1, 2005, Kamitakara, along with the town of Kuguno, and the villages of Asahi, Kiyomi, Miya, Nyūkawa, Shōkawa and Takane (all from Ōno District), and the town of Kokufu (also from Yoshiki District), was merged into the expanded city of Takayama and no longer exists as an independent municipality.

Notes

External links
 Official website of Takayama 

Dissolved municipalities of Gifu Prefecture
Takayama, Gifu